Strikeforce: Miami was a mixed martial arts event held by Strikeforce on January 30, 2010, in Sunrise, Florida, United States at the BankAtlantic Center.  The event aired live on Showtime in the US and on Super Channel in Canada.

Background
A bout between Bobby Lashley and Shane Del Rosario had previously been agreed upon, however the fight was scrapped from the card. Bobby Lashley was then expected to face Yohan Banks, however the bout needed commission approval, which was subsequently denied. Jimmy Ambriz was then targeted by the promotion as late replacement for Banks. However, Strikeforce decided not to go with Ambriz, despite being cleared by the Florida State Boxing Commission. Wes Sims stepped in on short notice to fight Lashley.

The bout between Joe Riggs and Jay Hieron was scheduled to air live on EASportsMMA.com but the load on the server brought down the stream.

The event drew an estimated average of 517,000 viewers on Showtime.

Results

Reported payout
The following is a list of fighter salaries as provided by the Florida Department of Business and Professional Regulation. The figures do not include deductions for items such as insurance, licenses and taxes. Additionally, the figures do not include money paid by sponsors, which can often be a substantial portion of a fighter's income.

Nick Diaz: $100,000 (no win bonus) def. Marius Zaromskis: $30,000
Cris Cyborg: $35,000 ($15,000 win bonus and $5,000 "championship" bonus) def. Marloes Coenen: $2,000
Herschel Walker: $600 (no win bonus) def. Greg Nagy: $5,000
Robbie Lawler: $100,000 (no win bonus) def. Melvin Manhoef: $5,000
Bobby Lashley: $50,000 (no win bonus) def. Wes Sims: $25,000
Jay Hieron: $65,000 ($35,000 win bonus) def. Joe Riggs: $30,000
Michael Byrnes: $2,000 ($1,000 win bonus) def. David Zitnik: $1,500
Joe Ray: $1,500 ($500 win bonus) def. John Clarke: $1,000
David Gomez: $2,000 ($1,000 win bonus) def. Craig Oxley: $1,500
Pablo Alfonso: $3,000 ($1,500 win bonus) def. Marcos DaMatta: $2,500
Hayder Hassan: $2,000 ($1,000 win bonus) def. Ryan Keenan: $2,000
Jeffrey Cachia: $2,000 ($1,000 win bonus) def. Matt Cooper: $1,000
John Kelly: $2,000 ($1,000 win bonus) def. Sabah Homasi: $1,000

References

See also
 Strikeforce (mixed martial arts)
 List of Strikeforce champions
 List of Strikeforce events
 2010 in Strikeforce

Miami
2010 in mixed martial arts
Mixed martial arts in Florida
Sports in Sunrise, Florida
2010 in sports in Florida